The Girls were an American all-female band from Los Angeles, California, United States. They called themselves The Sandoval Sisters and The Moonmaids before ending up as The Girls in 1965, when they signed a recording contract with Capitol Records. The members were sisters.  The group was formed of Rosemary (lead guitar), Diane (rhythm guitar), Sylvia (bass), and Margaret (drums and lead vocals) Sandoval. They released two singles with Capitol including a version of the biker song "Chico's Girl", written by Barry Mann and Cynthia Weil. The group toured the Far East, which included performing for the troops in Vietnam.

The four girls first recorded as 'The Four Queens' on Teron Records : "A Cinder In My Eye" / "The Boy Next Door" (1964).

"Chico's Girl" was included on the 2009 compilation album, The Shangri-Las & The '60s Girl Group Garage Sound.

See also
List of all-women bands

References

American girl groups
All-female bands
Rock music groups from California
Musical groups from Los Angeles
Capitol Records artists
History of women in California